Real Republicans F.C. is the name of several football clubs:

 Real Republicans F.C. (Ghana)
 Real Republicans F.C. (Sierra Leone)